The eighth season of the French version of Dancing with the Stars began in October 2017 on TF1. It was hosted by Sandrine Quétier. Co-host Laurent Ournac did not return to the show after two seasons and was replaced by different celebrities from TF1 invited to host that week: Arthur, Jean-Luc Reichmann, Christophe Beaugrand, Karine Ferri, Christophe Dechavanne, Nikos Aliagas, Laurence Boccolini, Denis Brogniart, Jean-Pierre Foucault, Carole Rousseau. Marie-Claude Pietragalla did not return to the panel after five seasons and was replaced by Nico Archambault. The returning judges were Jean-Marc Généreux, Chris Marques and Fauve Hautot.

Participants

Things To Know
Agustin Galiana is the first foreign contestant to ever win a trophy
It's the only season to have 3 contestants from abroad reaching the finals Agustin Galiana from Spain, Lenni-Kim from Canada and Tatiana Silva from Belgium

Scoring 

Red numbers indicate the couples with the lowest score for each week.
Blue numbers indicate the couples with the highest score for each week.
 indicates the couples eliminated that week.
 indicates the returning couple that finished in the bottom two.
 indicates the winning couple.
 indicates the runner-up couple.
 indicates the third place couple.

Averages 
This table only counts dances scored on the traditional 40-point scale.

Highest and lowest scoring performances
The best and worst performances in each dance according to the judges' marks:

Couples' highest and lowest scoring performances
According to the traditional 40-point scale:

Styles, scores and songs

Week 1 

 Individual judges' scores in the chart below (given in parentheses) are listed in this order from left to right: Nico Archambault, Jean-Marc Généreux, Fauve Hautot, Chris Marques.

Running order

Week 2:  Personal Story Week 

 Individual judges' scores in the chart below (given in parentheses) are listed in this order from left to right: Nico Archambault, Jean-Marc Généreux, Fauve Hautot, Chris Marques.

Running order

Week 3: Crazy Night 

 Individual judges' scores in the chart below (given in parentheses) are listed in this order from left to right: Nico Archambault, Jean-Marc Généreux, Fauve Hautot, Chris Marques.

Running order

Week 4: Coach's Night 

 Individual judges' scores in the chart below (given in parentheses) are listed in this order from left to right: Nico Archambault, Jean-Marc Généreux, Fauve Hautot, Chris Marques.

Running order

Week 5: Switch's Night 

 Individual judges' scores in the chart below (given in parentheses) are listed in this order from left to right: Nico Archambault, Jean-Marc Généreux, Fauve Hautot, Chris Marques, the telespectators.

Running order

Week 6: Family Choice 

 Individual judges' scores in the chart below (given in parentheses) are listed in this order from left to right: Nico Archambault, Jean-Marc Généreux, Fauve Hautot and Chris Marques.

Running order

Week 7: Hollywood Night 

 Individual judges' scores in the chart below (given in parentheses) are listed in this order from left to right: Nico Archambault, Jean-Marc Généreux, Fauve Hautot and Chris Marques.

Running order

Week 8: Welcome at The Dancers' 

 Individual judges' scores in the chart below (given in parentheses) are listed in this order from left to right: Nico Archambault, Jean-Marc Généreux, Fauve Hautot and Chris Marques.

Running order

Week 9: Tribute to Johnny Hallyday 

 Individual judges' scores in the chart below (given in parentheses) are listed in this order from left to right: Nico Archambault, Jean-Marc Généreux, Fauve Hautot and Chris Marques.

Running order

Week 10: Finals 

 Individual judges' scores in the chart below (given in parentheses) are listed in this order from left to right: Nico Archambault, Jean-Marc Généreux, Fauve Hautot and Chris Marques.

Running order

Dance chart

Ratings

References

Season 08
2017 French television seasons